A Buck or Two Stores Ltd. Formally styled as A $1 or 2 is a Canadian owned and operated chain of specialty retail stores that sell party supplies, cards and wrap, confection, school & office supplies, toys and crafts, seasonal items, housewares, hardware, and other essentials. It has been open since 1988.

Merchandise is mostly priced at $2.00 or less, and consists of both new merchandise (usually imported, though sometimes of Canadian origin) and closeouts.
It has 47 locations across Canada. In 2009, A Buck Or Two closed out all its Saskatchewan and Manitoba stores
 Alberta (5)
 British Columbia (5)
 Newfoundland (10)
 Ontario (20)
 Quebec (6)

See also
 Dollar ou Deux

External links 
 Buck or Two

1988 establishments in Canada
Companies based in Vaughan
Discount stores of Canada
Retail companies established in 1988
Variety stores